Richard Melvin Cangey (July 9, 1933 – October 29, 2003) was an American stunt performer and actor.

Early life
Cangey was born in Mahoningtown, Pennsylvania. After graduating from New Castle High School in 1951, he moved to nearby Cleveland, Ohio to pursue a career in boxing.

Career
Cangey was a Hollywood stuntman. He was among the stock company of stuntmen employed on the 1960s Western television series, The Wild Wild West. He was occasionally credited as an actor on the show, often acting as a henchman.

He landed bit parts in various other American TV series such as Gunsmoke, Mannix, and Vega$.

Personal life
At age 70, Cangey died in Orange County, California.

Filmography

Notes

External links
Inside the Wild Wild West, website of Cangey's
Biography of Cangey

American stunt performers
1933 births
2003 deaths